Jayesh Vitthalbhai Radadiya (born 20 December 1981) is an Indian politician from Bharatiya Janata Party and currently serving as the Cabinet Minister of Food, Civil Supply and Consumer Affairs, Cottage Industries, Printing & Stationery in Government of Gujarat. He is a member of the Gujarat Legislative Assembly representing Jetpur constituency in 14th Legislative Assembly of Gujarat.

Early life and education
Jayesh was born on 20 December 1981 in Jam Kandorna village of Rajkot district in Gujarat state of India to a Gujarati Patidar family, Vitthalbhai Radadiya and Chetna Ben. His parents had 4 sons namely Vaibhav, Jayesh, and Kalpesh - Lalit (Twins) of which Vaibhav and Kalpesh died in young age. Jayesh holds a degree of BE Civil from M.S. University. He married Mitalben and the couple have a son Mahik and daughter Krishna.

Political career
Jayesh has started his political career since his college days in M.S. University where he was elected as a General Secretary of the M.S. University Students Union, a statutory corporate body of the students in India. In 2009, he was elected as MLA from the Dhoraji constituency and represented the Indian National Congress. In 2012 he won the assembly elections from Jetpur on Congress ticket. But, he and his father then resigned in 2013 from Congress and joined BJP. In 2013, he was re-elected as MLA in a by-poll representing Bharatiya Janata Party from the Jetpur. He won from Jetpur again in 2017 and was made a minister by Chief Minister Rupani.

His father Vitthalbhai (1958-2019) was also a politician and Social Worker who had been elected as a Member of Gujarat Legislative Assembly for the five terms since 1990–2009, and later a Member of parliament, Lok Sabha for  2 terms from Porbandar Lok Sabha constituency since 2009.

References 

Living people
People from Porbandar
Bharatiya Janata Party politicians from Gujarat
Gujarat MLAs 2007–2012
Gujarat MLAs 2012–2017
State cabinet ministers of Gujarat
1981 births
Gujarat MLAs 2017–2022